Kosterin (Russian: Костерин) is a Russian masculine surname, its feminine counterpart is Kosterina. The surname may refer to the following notable people: 
Alexei Kosterin (1896–1968), Russian writer and revolutionary
Nina Kosterina (1921–1941), Soviet partisan and diarist
Oleg Kosterin (born 1963), Russian geneticist and entomologist
Tatyana Kosterina (born 1977), Russian horse dressage rider 
Vladimir Kosterin (born 1968), Ukrainian businessman and politician

See also
Kosterin's House in Russia

Russian-language surnames